Javier Arley Reina Calvo (born 4 January 1989) is a Colombian footballer who currently plays for Categoría Primera A club Independiente Medellín.

Club career
He began his football career at América de Cali, making his professional debut in 2005. There, he accumulated two goals in 33 appearances in all his spell at Cali-based team.

In April 2008, Reina headed to Brazil for Cruzeiro and in August 2008, joined the Série B side Ipatinga on loan. In the summer break of the 2010 Série A campaign, he signed a season-long loan deal with Ceará Sporting Club.

On 17 January 2011, Reina joined the South Korean club Chunnam Dragons on loan for 1 year. He scored 3 goals in 20 matches during his time with the club. After a loan spell in Korea, he moved to Ceará again on a permanent deal. On 4 July 2012, Reina returned to South Korea, signing a contract with Seongnam Ilhwa Chunma.

After a brief spell at Argentina's Club Olimpo during the 2013-14 season, in mid 2014 he joined Colombian powerhouse Millonarios. In July 2015, he returned to South Korea and his former club Seongnam FC, where he scored one goal in fifteen 2015 K League Classic matches.

On 9 January 2016, it was confirmed that Reina joined Chilean club Colo-Colo on loan, the country's most successful club.

In 2017, he joined Deportivo Pasto of the Categoría Primera A. He played both the Apertura and the Finalizacion tournaments of the 2017 Categoría Primera A season. He had another brief period at Ceara in 2018, before moving back to Colombia with Once Caldas in 2019.

Internacional career
Reina appeared with Colombia's U20 in the 2007 South American Youth Championship, appearing seven times in the contest.

References

External links
Colombia U-20 squad
 
 

1989 births
Living people
Colombian footballers
Colombian expatriate footballers
América de Cali footballers
Cruzeiro Esporte Clube players
Ipatinga Futebol Clube players
Esporte Clube Vitória players
Ceará Sporting Club players
Jeonnam Dragons players
Seongnam FC players
Olimpo footballers
Colo-Colo footballers
Millonarios F.C. players
Once Caldas footballers
Independiente Medellín footballers
Campeonato Brasileiro Série A players
K League 1 players
Chilean Primera División players
Argentine Primera División players
Expatriate footballers in Argentina
Expatriate footballers in Brazil
Expatriate footballers in Chile
Expatriate footballers in South Korea
Colombian expatriate sportspeople in Argentina
Colombian expatriate sportspeople in Brazil
Colombian expatriate sportspeople in Chile
Colombian expatriate sportspeople in South Korea
Footballers from Cali
Association football midfielders